Elections to the Patiala and East Punjab States Union Legislative Assembly were held on 27 March 1952. 374 candidates competed for the 50 constituencies in the Assembly. There were 10 two-member constituencies and 40 single-member constituencies.

Results

!colspan=10|
|- style="background-color:#E9E9E9; text-align:center;"
! class="unsortable" |
! Political party !! Flag !! Seats  Contested !! Won !! % of  Seats !! Votes !! Vote %
|-
| 
| style="text-align:left;" |Indian National Congress
| 
| 51 || 26 || 43.33 || 3,88,185 || 28.66
|- style="background: #90EE90;"
| 
| 
| 41 || 19 || 31.67 || 3,17,502 || 23.44
|-
| 
| style="text-align:left;" |Bharatiya Jana Sangh
|
| 23 || 2 || 3.33 || 43,809 || 3.23
|- style="background: #90EE90;"
| 
| style="text-align:left;" |Kisan Mazdoor Praja Party
|
| 15 || 1 || 1.67 || 20,179 || 1.49
|- style="background: #90EE90;"
| 
| style="text-align:left;" |Communist Party of India
| 
| 14 || 2 || 3.33 || 64,652 || 4.77
|- style="background: #90EE90;"
|
|
| 5 || 1 || 1.67 || 21,539 || 1.59
|-
|
| style="text-align:left;" |Scheduled Caste Federation
| 
| 7 || 1 || 1.67 || 47,216 || 3.49
|- style="background: #90EE90;"
| 
|
| 188 || 8 || 13.33 || 3,96,956 || 29.31
|- class="unsortable" style="background-color:#E9E9E9"
! colspan = 3| Total seats
! 60 !! style="text-align:center;" |Voters !! 22,98,385 !! style="text-align:center;" |Turnout !! 13,54,476 (58.93%)
|}

Elected members

United Democratic Front

After the elections, Congress party emerged as the single largest party, but in the absence of majority, Gian Singh Rarewala formed the government with the support of Akali Dal, Communist Party of India, Lal Communist Party Hind Union, Kisan Mazdoor Praja Party and Independents on 22 April 1952. The coalition was named as United Democratic Front. Thus, he became the first non-Congress Chief Minister of any state in independent India.

See also

 Patiala and East Punjab States Union Legislative Assembly
 1951–52 elections in India
 1952 Punjab Legislative Assembly election
 1954 Patiala and East Punjab States Union Legislative Assembly election

References

State Assembly elections in Punjab, India
1950s in Punjab, India
1952 State Assembly elections in India
March 1952 events in Asia